The EAM Nuvolari S1 is a limited production car announced in 1990 by the Munich-based company Edelsbrunner Automobile München. It had styling based on that of 1930s sports cars such as the Riley MPH and took its name from racing driver Tazio Nuvolari.

The car was presented at the München Cars show, in red color, impressing with unique style.

Technical data 

Equipment:-
Wheels by Aro
Folding hood
leather seats
Mahogany dashboard

Accessories available:-
cover
Estep 
side screens
Chromed wheels
luggage rack

The price ranged from 60,000 to 68,000 DM in 1994 equal to approximately to USD45,000. 20 to 30 cars were made.

Cars of Germany
Sports cars